Bharveli is a census town in Balaghat district in the state of Madhya Pradesh, India.

Demographics
 India census, Bharveli had a population of 9,101. Males constitute 50% of the population and females 50%. Bharveli has an average literacy rate of 65%, higher than the national average of 59.5%; with male literacy of 74% and female literacy of 57%. 15% of the population is under 6 years of age.

References

Cities and towns in Balaghat district